Jack Cunningham  (1 September 1926 – 18 October 1978) was the first Anglican Bishop of Central Zambia.

Educated at Queen Elizabeth Grammar School, Wakefield and Edinburgh Theological College he was ordained in 1953. He was a Curate at St Mark with St Barnabas, Coventry then held incumbencies at St Thomas and St Alban in the same city. In 1967 he emigrated to Zambia where he was Priest in charge of  St Michael, Kitwe before his appointment to the episcopate. He confirmed the present bishop of the diocese Derek Kamukwamba. 

He was appointed OBE in the 1978 New Year Honours.

References

1926 births
People educated at Queen Elizabeth Grammar School, Wakefield
Anglican bishops of Central Zambia
20th-century Anglican bishops in Africa
1978 deaths
Alumni of Edinburgh Theological College
Officers of the Order of the British Empire